Samuel Lyness Howe (May 14, 1864 – February 13, 1939) was a businessman and political figure in British Columbia. He represented Richmond-Point Grey in the Legislative Assembly of British Columbia from 1928 to 1933 as a Conservative.

Biography 
He was born in St. Vincent township, Grey County, Ontario, the son of Andrew Howe and Margaret Lyness, and was educated at the Ontario College of Pharmacy. In 1891, he married Arvilla Mary Andrews. Howe served five years as reeve of Thornbury, Ontario, and was also reeve of Point Grey, British Columbia. He was a member of the provincial cabinet, serving as Provincial Secretary and Minister of Fisheries. During World War I, Howe donated his yacht to the federal government for use in Haida Gwaii. He also donated two horses; one was used by Sir Arthur Currie. He died in Vancouver on February 13, 1939, at the age of 74.

The murals in the rotunda of the province's painted by George Henry Southwell were commissioned by Howe as Provincial Secretary.

Howe Street in Vancouver is named for him.

References 

1864 births
1939 deaths
British Columbia Conservative Party MLAs
People from The Blue Mountains, Ontario
Mayors of places in Ontario